Viktoria Sölkner (8 December 1905 – 28 September 1983) was an Austrian diver. She competed in the women's 3 metre springboard event at the 1924 Summer Olympics.

References

External links
 

1905 births
1983 deaths
Austrian female divers
Olympic divers of Austria
Divers at the 1924 Summer Olympics
Place of birth missing